Vouacapoua is a genus of legume in the family Fabaceae. 
It contains the following species:
 Vouacapoua americana

References

Cassieae
Taxonomy articles created by Polbot
Fabaceae genera